The Strathmore Apartments is a historic 8-unit multi-family complex located at 11005-11013 1/2 Strathmore Drive in the Westwood neighborhood of Los Angeles, California. Notable past residents, amongst others, include John Entenza, Charles Eames, Ray Eames, Luise Rainer, Clifford Odets, and Orson Welles.

The building is a part of a collection of homes designed by Los Angeles based modernist architect, Richard Neutra, and built in North West Westwood Village, which includes the Landfair Apartments, Elkay Apartments, and Kelton Apartments.

History 
The Strathmore Apartments were designed in 1937 in the international style of architecture by Los Angeles architect Richard Neutra. He was commissioned by the landowner to design a 4-unit building and added another four units next to the building for himself when he realized the lot was available. The complex includes a modern bungalow court. The early occupants, including Neutra's extended family members and actress Luise Rainer, has called the architectural style "cold" and "industrial."

UCLA Oceanographic and Atmospheric scientists and a mathematician later converted four of the eight units into condos, believed to be the first and only condo conversions done unto a Neutra building.

On April 8, 1988, the City of Los Angeles designated the complex a Los Angeles Historic-Cultural Monument.

References

External links
 Virtual Globetrotting: Interactive street view of the Stratford Apartments and surroundings
 Strathmore Apartments on flickr
 UCLA Math Dept. photos: Click on each thumbnail to see enlarge Note: the slideshow feature does not work.
 * NBC SoCal: Battle Over Student Housing Near_Neutra's Strathmore Apartments

Richard Neutra buildings
Apartment buildings in Los Angeles
Los Angeles Historic-Cultural Monuments
Residential buildings completed in 1937
1937 in California
International style architecture in California
Modernist architecture in California
Westwood, Los Angeles
National Register of Historic Places in Los Angeles